Stephen Park Turner (born March 1, 1951) is a researcher in social practice, social and political theory, and the philosophy of the social sciences. He is Graduate Research Professor in the Department of Philosophy of the University of South Florida, where he also holds the title Distinguished University Professor. He has held a NEH Fellowship, was Simon Honorary Professor at Manchester University and has twice been the Advanced Fellow at the Swedish Collegium for Advanced Studies

Turner was born in Chicago, Illinois. He graduated from the University of Chicago Laboratory Schools in 1968 and then attended the University of Missouri in Columbia, Missouri. He received his undergraduate and his two master's degrees (one in philosophy and one in sociology) and his Ph.D. in sociology, with a dissertation on a philosophical topic, later published as Sociological Explanation as Translation (1980) by Cambridge University Press in the Rose Monograph series of the American Sociological Association. He later studied with Richard Rorty and Edward Shils. He began his long affiliation with the University of South Florida in 1975. In 1987 Turner was appointed Graduate Research Professor in Sociology; since 1989 he has held the same title, now Distinguished University Professor, but in Philosophy. He has had visiting appointments at Virginia Tech, the University of Notre Dame, and Boston University. He is on the editorial board of some 15 journals, and is the longest serving "Collaborating Editor" of Social Studies of Science.

Scholarly interests

Practices: Turner has published in the overlapping fields of sociology and philosophy, particularly on the notion of practices. In The Social Theory of Practices as well as in other writings Turner argues against collective concepts like culture: what we call culture (and similar concepts), he argues, needs to be understood in terms of the means of its transmission. There is no collective server by which it is simply downloaded and "shared". What we take as "collective" is really produced through experiences of interaction which are different and produce different results for different individuals but which also produce a rough uniformity through mechanisms of feedback rather than "sharing". He has extended this argument in various places, most recently in relation to the philosophical idea of "normativity" which he argues is an explanation of "facts" which are the product of an unnecessary and mystery-producing redescription motivated by an attempt to take back ground from social science explanation.

Political theory: In the area of political theory, Turner has argued that the rise of expert knowledge has altered the conditions of liberal democracy by increasing the importance of a new form of politically relevant inequality: epistemic inequality. But, Turner does not argue that inequality justifies the reliance on experts. Instead, he argues that this is only one solution among many to the problems produced by the fact that knowledge is distributed unequally. Turner uses examples such as the claims in economics and the debate over climate change to show that reliance on experts can go wrong, and that the mechanisms of self-policing attributed to the scientific community are often ineffective. Deciding whether or not to accept the products of experts or expert communities is a political decision. To the extent that such decisions replace democratic deliberation or become the content of democratic deliberation, liberal democracy itself becomes transformed from government by discussion among the equally informed into contestation over expertise itself.

History of Sociology: Turner is also recognized for his contributions to the history of sociology, especially in The Impossible Science, a contemporary overview of the history of American sociology. He has published on the methodology of the social sciences, including the notion of causality. In particular, he focuses on the problems in statistical causality and the process of selection. This is connected to Turner's work on Max Weber's theory of causality, which Turner has shown is derived from law and legal probability, most notably in Max Weber. Lawyer as Social Thinker. He has also stressed Weber's use of empathy (Einfühlung) to solve the generic problem of the under-determination of description.

Turner is also editor or co-editor of an additional 11 books and author of some 60 articles, 44 book chapters, and 36 review essays and published exchanges.

Selected publications

Books
Sage Handbook of Political Sociology. William Outhwaite and Stephen Turner, eds. London: Sage. 2019.
The Calling of Social Thought: Rediscovering the Work of Edward Shils. Christopher Adair-Toteff and Stephen Turner, eds. Manchester: Manchester University Press. 2019.
Cognitive Science and the Social: A Primer. New York: Routledge. 2018.
The Politics of Expertise. New York: Routledge. 2014
Explaining the Normative. Oxford: Polity Press. 2010.
Review Essays on this book: Del Mar, Maksymilian. 2010. Normativism, anti-normativism and humanist pragmatism. Human Studies 33 (2-3):305-23; Fuller, Steve. 2010. Explaining the Normative. Times higher Education. 10 June 2010. ; Wickham, Gary. 2011. Dousing the Dragon's Fire. Thesis Eleven 107 (November): 106-114; Peregrin, Jaroslav. 2011. Review of S. Turner, Explaining the Normative. Organon F 18:405-11.
Liberal Democracy 3.0: Civil Society in an Age of Experts. London: Sage Publications. 2003.
Review on this book: Henderson, Kirsten. 2005. Liberal Democracy 3.0. Thesis Eleven 81:132..
Brains/Practices/Relativism: Social Theory after Cognitive Science. Chicago: University of Chicago Press. 2002.
Max Weber: The Lawyer as Social Thinker. London: Routledge. 1994, with Regis Factor.
Reviews: Breiner, Peter. Ethics7(3):554-54; Eliaeson, Sven. 1996. Acta Sociologica39(2): 226-31; Lassman, Peter. 1995. Sociology29 (3): 558-59; Poggi, Gianfranco. Contemporary Sociology25(1): 132-33; Savelsberg, American Journal of Sociology101(2): 497-98.
The Social Theory of Practices: Tacit Knowledge and Presuppositions. Oxford: Polity Press. 1994. This book has 440 entries on Google Scholar. 
The Impossible Science: An Institutional Analysis of American Sociology. Beverly Hills and London: Sage. 1990, with Jonathan Turner.
Review Essay on this book: Schroeter, Gerd. 1992. Mission impossible: Sociology in crisis (again). Journal of the History of the Behavioral Sciences 28:375-381. . Berger, Bennett. 1990. Review. Science16(250); 1020-21. DOI: 10.1126/science.250.4983.1020
The Search for a Methodology of Social Science: Durkheim, Weber, and the Nineteenth Century Problem of Cause, Probability, and Action. Boston Studies in the Philosophy of Science, 92. Dordrecht, Holland: Reidel. 1986.
Max Weber and the Dispute Over Reason and Value. A Study on Philosophy, Ethics, and Politics. London: Routledge & Kegan Paul. 1984, with Regis Factor. 
Review. Giddens, Anthony The Times literary Supplement of Higher Education, April 27, 1974. p. 21; Seideman, Stephen, 1985. Review. Max Weber: A classic analyzed. Contemporary Sociology. 14(6): 673-677. Tribe, Keith, 1985. Extended review. The Sociological Review. 33(1) 136-42.
'Sociological Explanation as Translation. Rose Monograph Series of the American Sociological Association. New York, Cambridge: Cambridge University Press. 1980. 
Review Essay of this book: Just, Roger. 1981. "Interpreting the indigenous" Times Literary Supplement4069, Friday, 27 March: 353.  and Brannigan, Augustine, 1983. Review. Canadian Journal of Sociology8(1)102-4.

Articles
"Morgenthau as Weberian Methodologist". European Journal of International Relations. 2009, with George Mazur.
"Political Epistemology, Experts and the Aggregation of Knowledge. Spontaneous Generations. 2009.
"A Weber for the Right-Thinking". International Journal of Politics, Culture and Society. 1998.
"Weber on Action". American Sociological review. 1983.

References 
3. List of former SCAS Fellows. http://www.swedishcollegium.se/subfolders/Fellows/Former_Fellows.html#t

External links 
Home page

American philosophers
American sociologists
University of Missouri alumni
1951 births
Living people
People from Chicago
University of Chicago Laboratory Schools alumni